, also known as Crows: Episode 0, is a 2007 Japanese action film based on the manga Crows by Hiroshi Takahashi. The film was directed by Takashi Miike with a screenplay by Shōgo Mutō, and stars Shun Oguri, Kyōsuke Yabe, Meisa Kuroki, and Takayuki Yamada. The plot serves as a prequel to the manga, and focuses on the power struggle between gangs of students at Suzuran All-Boys High School. The film was released in Japan on October 27, 2007. It has spawned two sequels, Crows Zero 2 and Crows Explode, as well as a manga adaptation released November 13, 2008.

Plot 
Newly transferred high school senior Genji Takiya (Shun Oguri) arrives at Suzuran All-Boys High School, an institution infamous for its population of violent delinquents. During the freshman orientation assembly, yakuza arrive at the school seeking vengeance on third-year Serizawa Tamao (Takayuki Yamada) for assaulting some members of their gang. The thugs mistake Genji for their target and a brawl ensues on the school field. Meanwhile, Serizawa is visiting his best friend Tatsukawa Tokio (Kenta Kiritani), who has just been discharged from a hospital. Upon returning to the school, Serizawa witnesses Genji defeat the last of the yakuza.

That night, Genji goes to a nightclub he frequents and meets R&B singer Aizawa Ruka (Meisa Kuroki). He then goes to see his father, yakuza boss Takiya Hideo (Goro Kishitani), to whom he proclaims his ambition to conquer Suzuran, a feat which Hideo himself had attempted in his youth, but failed. Genji makes Hideo promise to acknowledge him as his successor should he succeed. The next day, Genji challenges Serizawa to a fight, but is halted by Tokio. He tells Genji that if he really wants to make an impression he should begin by defeating Rindaman, a legendary fighter at the school. After Rindaman refuses his challenge, Genji encounters Katagiri Ken (Kyosuke Yabe), one of the yakuza who'd come to the school the previous day. He attacks Genji in retaliation for getting his gang arrested, but is taken down with a single punch. Humbled, Ken goes with Genji to the club where they discuss the latter's plans for Suzuran.

Following advice from Ken, Genji begins building his army, called "Genji Perfect Seiha" (a.k.a. "GPS"). Anticipating the brewing conflict, Serizawa also begins recruiting factions for his own cause. Genji succeeds in rallying several strong members, including Tamura Chūta, Makise Takashi, and Izaki Shun. Serizawa is alarmed by Genji's rapid rise to power, but chooses not to take action. One of Serizawa's lieutenants, Tokaji Yūji, is not so ambivalent and begins covertly attacking members of the GPS, severely beating Chūta and putting Izaki in the hospital. The provocations cause tensions between the two armies to rise drastically, but Genji is prevented from acting by Makise. One night, Tokio and Serizawa visit the nightclub and encounter Genji. As Tokio runs interference between the opposing leaders, he suffers a seizure and is rushed to a hospital, where he learns that he has a cerebral aneurysm which requires surgery. Despite initial hesitation about the procedure's 30% success rate, Tokio agrees to the operation.

Tokaji approaches Bandō Hideto, leader of "The Front of Armament" biker gang, with a plan to kidnap Ruka and further aggravate Genji. Elsewhere, yakuza boss Yazaki Jōji orders Ken to kill Genji, disregarding the fact that doing so will incite a war between the yakuza organizations. The task proves to be too much for Ken, who has grown fond of Genji and begins lamenting his decision to become a yakuza in the first place. He decides to inform Takiya Hideo of the plot to kill his son. Genji gets a call from Ruka, who tells him that she is being held hostage by men with skulls on their jackets, and that her captors mentioned the name "Bandō". Surmising that her captors are The Armament, Genji gathers the GPS and proceeds to the biker gang's headquarters. A fight ensues, but Genji soon realizes that the men they are fighting are missing their trademark skull patches. Bandō demands an end to fight, revealing that he'd ordered the skulls be removed after part of The Armament aligned with Tokaji. After locating Tokaji and saving Ruka, Genji decides it's finally time for war against Serizawa. They decide to fight at 5:00pm the following day, at the same time that Tokio will undergo his operation, with Serizawa believing it will allow him to fight alongside Tokio.

The next day, as the battle begins, the tide seems to be in Serizawa's favor, but after Bandō's faction of The Armament arrives and joins the GPS, the odds are evened out. The fighting continues until only Serizawa and Genji are left standing. Meanwhile, Ken is taken to the harbor to be executed for disobeying the order to kill Genji. Yazaki gives Ken his coat as a parting gift before shooting him in the back. He falls into the water and begins to sink. Genji and Serizawa fight well into the night, and though injured and exhausted, Genji eventually gains the upper hand and triumphs. Clinging to consciousness, Serizawa receives a call from the hospital informing him that Tokio's operation was a success. Back at the docks, Ken suddenly recovers and swims to the surface. He discovers that the coat Yazaki had given to him was bulletproof, and that his "execution" was a ploy to allow him to leave the organization and live a different life.

Several days later, Genji again challenges Rindaman, the final obstacle on his path to ruling Suzuran. Rindaman expresses his belief that Suzuran can never be truly conquered, and that there will always be someone left to fight. The film ends as the skirmish between Genji and Rindaman begins.

Characters

Genji Perfect Seiha (GPS) 

 Genji Takiya
 Takashi Makise
 Chuta Tamura
 Izaki Shun
 Wandi Bakim

Serizawa Army 

 Serizawa Tamao
 Tatsukawa Tokio
 Tokaji Yūji
 Tsutsumoto Shoji
 The Mikami Brothers (ex-members)

The Front of Armament (Second Year, Biker Gang) 

 Bandō Hideto

Ebizuka Junior High Trio (First Year) 

 Kirishima Hiromi
 Honjō Toshiaki
 Sugihara Makoto

Unaffliliated 

 Rindaman / Hayashida Megumi

Cast 
 Shun Oguri as Genji Takiya
 Takayuki Yamada as Serizawa Tamao
 Sansei Shiomi - Yoshinobu Kuroiwa
 Kenichi Endō - Joji Yazaki
 Meisa Kuroki as Aizawa Ruka
 Kyōsuke Yabe as Katagiri Ken
 Kenta Kiritani as Tatsukawa Tokio
 Suzunosuke Tanaka as Tamura Chūta
 Sousuke Takaoka as Izaki Shun
 Goro Kishitani as Takiya Hideo
 Motoki Fukami as Rindaman / Hayashida Megumi
 Yusuke Izaki as Mikami Takeshi
 Hisato Izaki as Mikami Manabu
 Shunsuke Daito as Kirishima Hiromi
 Yusuke Kamiji as Tsutsumoto Shōji
 Tsutomu Takahashi as Makise Takashi
 Yu Koyanagi as Sugihara Makoto
 Kaname Endo as Tokaji Yūji
 Dai Watanabe as Bandō Hideto
 Ryo Hashizume as Honjō Toshiaki
 Kazuki Namioka as Washio Gōta

Release
The film was released in Japan on October 27, 2007. It was also screened internationally in Malaysia, Singapore, Taiwan, South Korea, and Hong Kong throughout 2008. The film was released on DVD in the United States on March 31, 2009.

Reception

Box office
The film grossed US$22,036,607 worldwide.

Critical reception
Reviews of the film have been average. Najib Zulfikar of Total Film gave the film 3 out of 5 stars, stating, "Miike amps it all up to 11 in his inimitable style, as impossibly coiffured pretty boys duke it out and the Yakuza take an interest in the outcome. Sadly, the story’s so overpopulated it’s hard to care who’ll survive to graduate." Similarly, David Brook of Blueprint Review gave the film 2.5 out of 5 stars indicating, "Teenage boys will lap up every minute of it (other than the songs which probably won’t appeal to many Westerners) and the lack of obviously ‘bad’ and ‘good’ guys means the conclusion wasn't always going to be clear cut (after an hour or so you can see where its heading though)."

Sequels and adaptations
The film was followed by two sequels: Crows Zero 2 (also directed by Miike) in 2009 and Crows Explode in 2014. It was also adapted into a manga illustrated by Kenichirō Naitō and published in Monthly Shōnen Champion magazine.

References

External links 

2007 films
2000s Japanese-language films
Live-action films based on manga
Films directed by Takashi Miike
2000s gang films
2000s high school films
Japanese high school films
Juvenile delinquency in fiction
2000s Japanese films